"I Want to Go Where No One Knows Me" is a song written by Kenneth Grant and Jerry Jericho and recorded by American country music artist Jean Shepard. The song reached number 18 on the Billboard Most Played C&W in Jockeys chart.  Skeeter Davis recorded this song (as "I Want to Go Where Nobody Knows Me" on her 1963 album, Skeeter Davis Sings The End of the World.

Chart performance

References 

1958 singles
Jean Shepard songs
Song recordings produced by Ken Nelson (American record producer)
1958 songs